Tetrorchidium ulugurense is a species of plant in the family Euphorbiaceae. It is endemic to Tanzania.

References

Adenoclineae
Flora of Tanzania
Taxonomy articles created by Polbot

Critically endangered flora of Africa